Harold Lee Deters (born January 16, 1944) is a former American football placekicker in the National Football League for the Dallas Cowboys. He played college football at North Carolina State University.

Early years
Deters attended Grainger High School. He accepted a football scholarship from North Carolina State University. As a senior, he made 10 out of 21 field goals. 

He set 5 Atlantic Coast Conference field goal records, finishing his college career with 21 out of 42 field goals made and didn't miss any extra point attempt.

Professional career
Deters was selected by the Dallas Cowboys in the twelfth round (312th overall) of the 1967 NFL Draft. He began the season as the starter at placekicker, but made only one out of four field goals and was placed on the taxi squad after the third game against the Los Angeles Rams on November 15. He retired at the end of the season to become a teacher.

References

1944 births
Living people
Players of American football from North Carolina
American football placekickers
NC State Wolfpack football players
Dallas Cowboys players